Paraplatyptilia lineata is a moth of the family Pterophoridae that is found in Russia (Ural mountains).

The forewings and hindwings are greyish brown.

Taxonomy
It is sometimes treated as a synonym of Paraplatyptilia sahlbergi.

References

Moths described in 1984
lineata
Endemic fauna of Russia